JamBase is an online database and news portal of live music and festivals with a focus on jam bands. It was founded by Andy Gadiel and Ted Kartzman in 1998. The website primarily acts as a service, providing a public API that concert promoters and venues use to publish concert data to the site. The data is also used by third-party developers for other products. In addition to raw data, the website includes a news section publishing information about concerts in a blog format.

, JamBase ranks as the 4,945th most visited sites in the United States according to Alexa, and 27,837th globally.

, JamBase's public API at http://api.jambase.com was disabled, as well as developer information at http://developer.jambase.com being removed without notice. No statement has been released by JamBase in regards to the public API's future.

References

External links
 

Online databases
1998 establishments in the United States
American music websites